Jammu Janbaz is a franchise cricket team that represents Jammu in the Kashmir Premier League. Faheem Ashraf was the captain and Riaz Afridi was the coach of the team. Sharjeel Khan was announced as Jammu Janbaz’s icon player.

Squad

Season standings

Points table

League fixtures and results

Statistics

Most runs 

Source: Cricinfo

Most wickets 

Source: Cricinfo

References

Kashmir Premier League (Pakistan)